De'Andre De'Wayne "D. D." Lewis (born January 8, 1979) is a former American football linebacker. He was signed by the Seattle Seahawks as an undrafted free agent in 2002. He played college football at Texas and high school football at Aldine High School in Houston. In between his two stints with the Seahawks Lewis also played for the Denver Broncos.

Professional career

Seattle Seahawks (first stint)
He was not selected in the 2002 NFL Draft, but signed with the Seattle Seahawks and played in all 16 games during his rookie season making 24 tackles (four assists). In the 2005 season, Lewis started 12 games and was part of the Seahawks run to the Super Bowl. During Super Bowl XL, he blocked Pittsburgh Steelers quarterback Ben Roethlisberger during a controversial touchdown call.  He also had his only career sack in 2006. Lewis was a fine utility player and did what was asked of him. During the 2006 season, D.D. Lewis was instrumental in the development of the Seahawks possibly going to a 3–4 with the addition of Julian Peterson but was denied the opportunity because coach's decision. After suffering a turf toe injury, he was sideline the rest of the year and had surgery.

Denver Broncos
On April 26, 2007, he signed a one-year deal with the Denver Broncos. He played five games for the Broncos but did not record a tackle. On October 15, 2007, he asked for his release and it was granted.

Seattle Seahawks (second stint)
On March 25, 2008, the Seahawks re-signed Lewis to a one-year deal. Lewis played in 14 games in 2008, starting two. He recorded 36 tackles and nine assists. He was also selected as one of the team captains, a high honor amongst coaches and teammates.

Lewis re-signed with Seattle on March 14, 2009 and was the backup for OLB Aaron Curry. He was cut on September 5, 2009 on the final day of roster cuts. The Seahawks re-signed him on September 14 because of salary issues. Lewis played in 12 games in 2009, recording seven tackles with two assists. He suffered an injury-filled year which limited his opportunities to get on the field.

References

External links
Seattle Seahawks profile

1979 births
Living people
American football linebackers
Denver Broncos players
Seattle Seahawks players
Texas Longhorns football players
Sportspeople from Bremerhaven
Players of American football from Houston